Appa or APPA may refer to:

Organizations
American Pet Products Association, an industry association in the United States
 American Psychopathological Association, a scientific professional organization
 American Philosophical Practitioners Association, a non-profit educational organization
American Public Power Association, an energy trade organization

Entertainment

Appa (band), a Japanese rock band formed in 2004
Appa (character), a creature from the television program Avatar: The Last Airbender
Appa (judge royal), Hungarian noble from the 12th century
Appa (rapper) (born 1983), Moroccan-Dutch rapper
Appa (2016 film), a 2016 Indian Tamil language film
Appa (2019 film), a 2019 Nepali language film

Other uses

Appa, name of two trading posts of the Dutch West India Company in Benin, see Dutch Slave Coast

See also 
 Appam, a type of pancake